Ryan Ramdass (born 3 July 1983) is a Guyanese cricketer of Indian descent. Ramdass is a right-handed batsman and a right-arm offbreak bowler who occasionally occupies the position of wicketkeeper.

He made his debut for Guyana in a match against Barbados in which he scored a half-century. When Guyana was hit by floods in early 2005, Ramdass' poultry business was affected, but he continued to play for the squad, achieving his career best 144 not out against Barbados.

In 2005, he selected for the full West Indies squad after a good set of results in the recent West Indies A series in Sri Lanka, playing in two matches.

References

1983 births
Living people
Guyanese cricketers
West Indies One Day International cricketers
West Indies Test cricketers
Guyana cricketers
Indo-Guyanese people
West Indies B cricketers
People from Demerara-Mahaica